Rob Jackson born 4 September 1981 is an English former professional rugby league footballer who played for Whitehaven in National League One, usually as a , but also as a .

Background
Jackson was born in Salford, Greater Manchester, England.

Playing career
He played for the London Broncos and the Leigh Centurions in the Super League after coming through the Wigan Warriors  Academy.

References

External links
Whitehaven profile
SL stats
Rugby League Project stats

1981 births
Living people
English rugby league players
Leigh Leopards players
London Broncos players
Rugby league centres
Rugby league players from Salford
Whitehaven R.L.F.C. players
Rugby articles needing expert attention